Radio NOVA is a radio station licensed by the Broadcasting Authority of Ireland, based in Dublin, Ireland. It was awarded its broadcasting licence by the BAI in September 2008 and launched on 1 September 2010. It is the only Dublin radio station licensed to transmit to the extensive Dublin commuter belt, including Dublin, Wicklow, Kildare, Louth, and Meath (County Offaly can also pick up the frequency of Radio NOVA 100fm however it is greater in some areas than others and Mullingar County Westmeath usually cannot get the station). NOVA is available throughout County Louth, in south Armagh, south Down, east Tyrone and north Armagh although in some of these areas reception is patchy. NOVA broadcasts on 100.3 FM from Three Rock Mountain Dublin, 100.5 from Saggart Hill, County Dublin, to serve County Kildare and 95.7 FM from Bray Head in North Wicklow, to cover County Wicklow. The station covers County Meath from its main Dublin transmitter (100.3 MHz).Radio NOVA 100fm in County Offaly operates (100.3 MHz) to 100.5.

Shareholding
The current parent company of Radio Nova is Bay Broadcasting. Bay Broadcasting shareholders include Kevin Branigan and Mike Ormonde. Bay Broadcasting also owns Ireland's Classic Hits Radio.

Former shareholders included Vienna Investments, Des Whelan and Pat McDonagh.

Programming
NOVA broadcasts what it describes as a diet of "guitar-based music". In November 2012, it received a derogation from the Broadcasting Authority of Ireland to reduce its news content from 20% of total programming to 10%, on account of it being a special interest station. As a result, NOVA continues to broadcast hourly news bulletins between 6 am and 12 midnight, as well as music news segments at various times during the day. Its main newscasters are John Harte and David Layde with cover provided by Elaine Stenson.

Location
The station is based at Castleforbes House, Castleforbes Road, in the north east of Dublin.

See also
Radio Nova (Ireland) - pirate station by the same name operating from 1981 to 1986

External links
Radio NOVA Homepage
Bruce Springsteen info

References

Rock radio stations in Ireland